The following are the Indiana High School Athletic Association (IHSAA) sports conference alignments for the 2013–2014 school year.

The IHSAA Conferences 2021–2022
Note 1: Boone Grove and South Central (Union Mills) compete in the Greater South Shore Conference as football-only members.  They compete in all other sports in the Porter County Conference.
Note 2: The Mid-Indiana Football Conference competes only in football.  It is made up of four Mid-Hoosier Conference football-playing schools (Eastern Hancock, Indian Creek, Knightstown, North Decatur, South Decatur), and Milan from the Ohio River Valley Conference.
Note 3:  The Southwest Conference competes only in football.  It is made up of schools from the Blue Chip Conference (North Knox and Wood Memorial) and Southwest Indiana Conference (Eastern Greene, North Central (Farmersburg)).

Non IHSAA School Conferences:

 Central Indiana Christian Conference
 Colonial Christian - Indianapolis
 Cornerstone Christian - Indianapolis
 Eagledale Christian - Indianapolis
 Heritage Hall - Muncie
 Indiana Christian- Anderson
 Suburban Christian - Indianapolis
 Tabernacle - Martinsville
 Terre Haute Christian

 Heartland Homeschool Conference
 Anderson Homeschool Sons
 Eastside Golden Eagles - Indianapolis
 Indianapolis Homeschool Wildcats
 Living Water Marlins - Plainfield
 Noblesville Lions
 Northwest Warriors - Indianapolis

 South Shore Christian Conference
 Calumet Christian
 Christian Haven
 Families of Faith Christian Academy (Illinois)
 First Baptist School - Mishawaka
 Grace Baptist Christian - Plymouth
 Granger Christian
 Home School Resource Center (Illinois)
 Luther East (Illinois)
 Mishawaka Christian Athletic Club
 Portage Christian
 Victory Christian

Conference Changes 
Note: Only partial information is available before the 1994-95 school year.

1993–1994 
The Indiana Lake Shore conference became the Lake 10 Conference with the addition of five schools:
 Calumet, Griffith, Highland, and Munster joined from the Lake Suburban Conference.
 Whiting joined after playing as an Independent.

The Lake Suburban Conference disbanded after four schools leave for the Lake 10:
 Crown Point joined the Duneland Conference.
 Lowell joined the Northwest Hoosier Conference.
 Lake Central became an independent.

1994–1995 
 Southwestern (Hanover) was removed from the Ohio River Valley Conference for rule violations.

1995–1996 
 Michigan City Elston and Michigan City Rogers consolidated into Michigan City High School.  MCHS retained Rogers's spot in the Duneland Conference, vacating Elston's spot in the Northern Indiana Conference.
 Triton Central left the Rangeland Conference to play as an independent.
 Indianapolis Howe and Indianapolis Washington both closed, leaving the Indianapolis Public Schools Conference at 5 teams.

1996–1997 
 Delta left the White River Conference to play as an independent.
 Seymour joined the Hoosier Hills Conference, keeping their membership in the South Central Conference simultaneously.
 Shelbyville left the South Central Conference to play as an independent.
 Triton Central joined the Mid-Hoosier Conference, previously playing as an independent for a season after leaving the Rangeland Conference.

1997–1998 
Conference Indiana was formed from six of the 
Central Suburban Conference schools: 
 Decatur Central
 Franklin Central
 Lawrence Central
 Perry Meridian
 Pike
 Southport
and four South Central Conference schools:
 Bloomington North
 Bloomington South
 Columbus North
 Martinsville

The Metropolitan Athletic Conference was formed:
 Ben Davis (former Independent)
 Carmel (former Olympic Conference)
 Center Grove (former South Central)
 Lawrence North (former Central Suburban)
 Terre Haute North (former Independent)
 Terre Haute South (former Independent)
 North Central (Indianapolis) (former Independent)
 Warren Central (former Independent)

The Hoosier Conference disbanded:
 Harrison (West Lafayette) and McCutcheon left the Hoosier Conference to join the Olympic Conference.
 Benton Central, Twin Lakes, and West Lafayette played as independents for the season.
 Brownsburg joined the Olympic Conference, formerly playing as an independent.
 Delta joined the Hoosier Heritage Conference, formerly playing as an independent.
 Hamilton Southeastern left the Hoosier Heritage Conference for the Olympic Conference.
 Seymour left the South Central Conference, playing exclusively in the Hoosier Hills Conference.  Previously they were a member of both conferences.
 Shelbyville joined the Hoosier Heritage Conference, formerly playing as an independent for a season after leaving the South Central Conference.
 Yorktown left the White River Conference to join the Rangeline Conference.
 Anderson Madison Heights closed, leaving the Olympic Conference at 10 members.

1998–1999 
The Lake 10 Conference was renamed the Lake Athletic Conference 
 Andrean joined after playing as an Independent.
 Lowell and Lake Station Edison both left the Northwest Hoosier.
The Hoosier Conference was reformed. Previous conference members Benton Central, Twin Lakes, and West Lafayette were joined by:
 Delphi (former Hoosier Heartland Conference)
 Rensselaer Central (former Northwest Hoosier)

The Northland Conference was formed:
 Argos (former Independent)
 Marquette Catholic (former Independent)
 Oregon-Davis (former Independent)
 River Forest (former Northwest Hoosier)
 South Central (Union Mills) (former Independent)
 Westville (former Porter County Conference)
 Eastbrook left the Mid-Indiana Conference to join the Central Indiana Conference.
 Frankton left the White River Conference to join the Central Indiana Conference.
 Peru left the Central Indiana Conference to join the Mid-Indiana Conference.
 Tipton left the Central Indiana Conference to join the Rangeline Conference.
 Kankakee Valley, North Judson, and North Newton, the remnants of the Northwest Hoosier Conference, play as independents.
 Southwestern (Hanover) rejoined the Ohio River Valley Conference after being forced out due to rules violations in 1995.

1999–2000 
The Western Indiana Conference was formed:
 Brown County (former Mid-Hoosier Conference)
 Edgewood (former West Central Conference)
 Northview (former Independent)
 Owen Valley (former West Central Conference)
 South Vermillion (former Wabash River Conference)
 Sullivan (former Tri-River Conference)
 West Vigo (former independent)
 Danville and Tri-West Hendricks both left the West Central Conference to join the Sagamore Conference.
 Fort Wayne Canturbury joined the Midland Conference
 Speedway left the Mid-State Conference to join the West Central Conference.
 Yorktown left the Rangeline Conference to join the Hoosier Heritage Conference.

2000–2001 
The Hoosier Crossroads Conference was formed from the members of the Olympic Conference West Division:
 Brownsburg
 Hamilton Southeastern
 Harrison (West Lafayette)
 McCutcheon
 Noblesville
plus:
 Avon (former Mid-State Conference)
 Westfield (former Rangeline Conference)
 Zionsville (former Rangeline Conference)
 Sheridan and Tipton both left the Rangeline Conference to play in the Hoosier Conference.
 Hamilton Heights left the Rangeline Conference to play in the Mid-Indiana Conference.
 Indianapolis Scecina Memorial, the sole remaining Rangeline Conference member, played as an independent.
 Elkhart Memorial joined the Northern Lakes Conference, keeping their membership in the Northern Indiana Conference simultaneously.
 Wood Memorial left the Pocket Athletic Conference to play as an independent.

2001–2002 
 Elkhart Memorial left the Northern Indiana Conference to exclusively play in the Northern Lakes Conference.  Previously they were a member of both conferences.
 Tell City left the Big Eight Conference to join the Pocket Athletic Conference.
 Wood Memorial joined the Blue Chip Conference, formerly playing as an independent for a year after leaving the Pocket Athletic Conference.

2002–2003 
 Eastern (Pekin) left the Southern Conference to join the Mid-South Conference.
 South Bend St. Joseph's joined the Northern Indiana Conference, formerly playing as an independent.  They took the place of South Bend LaSalle, which closed prior to this season.
 Fort Wayne Canterbury left the Midland Conference to play as an independent.

2003–2004 
 Mount Carmel of Illinois joined the Big Eight Conference after the breakup of the North Egypt  Conference, becoming the only non-Indiana member of an Indiana conference.
 Lake Central joined the Duneland Conference, formerly competing as an independent.
 Mishawaka Marian joined the Northern Indiana Conference, formerly competing as an independent.
 Hobart left the Duneland conference to join the Lake Athletic Conference.
 Kankakee Valley joined the Lake Athletic Conference, formerly competing as an independent.
 Wheeler left the Porter County Conference to join the Lake Athletic Conference.
 South Central (Union Mills) left the Northland Conference to join the Porter County Conference.
 Lafayette Jefferson left the North Central Conference to compete as an independent.

2004–2005 
 Gary Mann closed, leaving the Northwestern Conference at four schools.
 Lafayette Jefferson joined the Hoosier Crossroads Conference, formerly playing as an Independent for a season after leaving the North Central Conference.
 Huntington North left the Olympic Conference to join the North Central Conference.
 Indianapolis Howe and Indianapolis Washington were reopened, and rejoined the Indianapolis Public Schools Conference.
 Elkhart Christian joined the Northland Conference, formerly competing as an independent.

2005–2006 
The Indiana Crossroads Conference was formed:
 Beech Grove (former Mid-State Conference)
 Indianapolis Cardinal Ritter (former Independent)
 Indianapolis Park Tudor (former Independent, former Mid-Indiana Football Conference football-only member)
 Indianapolis Scecina Memorial (former Independent)
 Garrett left the Northeast Corner Conference and joined the Allen County Conference.

2006–2007 
 Decatur Central and Martinsville left Conference Indiana to join the Mid-State Conference.
 Wabash left the Central Indiana Conference to join the Three Rivers Conference.
 Oak Hill left the Three Rivers Conference to join the Central Indiana Conference.

2007–2008 
Three new conferences came into existence out of the Lake Athletic Conference's breakup:
Great Lakes Conference
 Hammond (former LAC Black Division)
 Hammond Clark (former LAC Blue Division)
 Hammond Gavit (former LAC Blue Division)
 Hammond Morton (former LAC Black Division)

Greater South Shore
 North Newton (former Independent)
 Lake Station Edison (former LAC Blue Division)
 Hammond Bishop Noll (former LAC Blue Division)
 Michigan City Marquette (former Northland member)
 Calumet (former LAC Blue Division)
 River Forest (former Northland member, former football-only Independent)
 Wheeler (former LAC Blue Division)
 Whiting (former LAC Blue Division)
In addition, with Marquette Catholic not fielding a football team, South Central (Union Mills) of the Porter County Conference plays in the GSSC for football.  They were previously an independent.

Northwest Crossroads Conference
 Andrean (former LAC Black Division)
 Griffith (former LAC Black Division)
 Highland (former LAC Black Division)
 Hobart (former LAC Black Division)
 Kankakee Valley (former LAC Blue Division)
 Lowell (former LAC Black Division)
 Munster (former LAC Black Division)
 Forest Park left the Blue Chip Conference to join the Pocket Athletic Conference, coinciding with the start of their football program.
 Fishers High School was reopened and joined the Hoosier Crossroads Conference, giving them 10 schools.
 Indianapolis Crispus Attucks was reopened, and rejoined the Indianapolis Public Schools Conference.

2008–2009 
 Wes-Del left the White River Conference in all sports except football to join the Mid-Eastern Conference.  They are now a football-only participant in the White River.

2009–2010 
The Pioneer Conference was formed:
 Baptist Academy - Indianapolis (former Central Indiana Christian Conference)
 Greenwood Christian (former Independent)
 Indianapolis Attucks (former Indianapolis Public Schools Conference)
 International (former Independent)
 Liberty Christian (former independent)
 Gary Wirt closed, leaving the Northwestern Conference at three schools.
 Lapel (former White River Conference) and Indianapolis Lutheran (former independent) joined the Indiana Crossroads Conference, giving the conference 6 schools. Lapel competed in both the ICC and WRC simultaneously.
 Wes-Del ended their football-only affiliation with the WRC, playing as an independent.

2010–2011 
 Anderson Highland closed, leaving three Olympic Conference schools: Connersville, Jay County, and Muncie South Side. Concerns over Muncie South Side also closing after the school year caused the remaining three schools to disband the conference and play as independents.
 Fort Wayne Elmhurst closed, leaving the Summit Conference at 9 schools.
 Indianapolis Marshall and Indianapolis Shortridge joined conferences after being reopened the previous year. Marshall rejoined the Indianapolis Public Schools Conference, while Shortridge joined the Pioneer Conference.
 Lapel joined the Indiana Crossroads Conference full-time, effectively folding the White River Conference. Eastern Hancock, Knightstown, and Shenandoah become independent with the dissolution of the league.
 Morton Memorial closed, having played independently since leaving the Big Blue River Conference in 1970.

2011–2012 
 Lafayette Central Catholic left the Hoosier Heartland Conference for the Hoosier Conference.
 Harding closed, leaving the Summit Conference at 8 schools.
 Edinburgh left the Mid-Indiana Football Conference to become independent; all other sports remain in Mid-Hoosier Conference.
 Campagna Academy & White's Institute withdrew membership from the IHSAA

2012–2013 
 Sheridan left the Hoosier Conference for the Hoosier Heartland Conference, completing the swap of Sheridan and Lafayette Central Catholic between the two conferences.
Eastern Hancock, independent since the White River Conference folded, joined the Mid-Hoosier Conference. They were originally scheduled to join in 2013 with Knightstown, but were able to adjust their schedules to join early.

2013–2014 
 Rushville and Connersville joined the Eastern Indiana Athletic Conference. Connersville had been independent since the demise of the Olympic Conference, while Rushville left the Hoosier Heritage Conference.
 Hanover Central joined the Greater South Shore Conference from the Porter County Conference. Originally scheduled to take place in 2015, the PCC allowed this move to happen two years early. The GSSC also added Boone Grove in football only, remaining in the PCC in all other sports.
 Westville, independent since the Northland Conference folded, rejoins the Porter County Conference, taking Hanover Central's place.
Knightstown, a former WRC school, joins the Mid-Hoosier Conference.
 New Castle Chrysler voted to take Rushville's spot in the Hoosier Heritage Conference in 2014, and is removed by the North Central Conference immediately. The HHC arranged for New Castle to compete in some sports immediately, allowing the school partial affiliation.
 The Metropolitan Conference and Conference Indiana essentially swap teams. Lawrence Central and Pike went to the MIC, while Terre Haute North and South were taken in as football-only members of CI. Shortly after the football season, they were both accepted into full membership starting in 2014.

2014–2015 
 Lafayette Jefferson, McCutcheon, and West Lafayette Harrison join the North Central Conference. The three schools were part of the Hoosier Crossroads Conference, but had been voted out as the HCC shrank their footprint.
 Muncie Burris was voted out of the Mid-Eastern Conference. They play as an Independent this year before joining the Pioneer Conference.
 Jay County joined the Allen County Athletic Conference, having been independent since the demise of the Olympic Conference in 2010.
 Monrovia left the West Central Conference for the Indiana Crossroads Conference, leaving the WCC at five schools.
 Lapel left the Indiana Crossroads Conference to become Independent.
 Garret returned to the Northeast Corner Conference after a few years in the Allen County Conference.
 Union (Dugger) is closed. A charter school, Dugger Union High School, is formed to take its place (complete with athletics), however decided not to pursue IHSAA membership for this school year due to the short time span between the school's formation and application deadline.
 Muncie South Side, whose uncertain status caused the Olympic Conference to fold, is closed. This also means that the second and third high schools in the three cities that prompted the formation of the OC (Anderson, Kokomo, and Muncie) have all closed, leaving all three with one NCC-affiliated high school.

2015–2016 
This year marks a major shakeup for Indiana conferences.
The Hoosier North Athletic Conference is formed by the following schools:
 Caston (former Midwest Conference)
 Culver (former Northern State Conference)
 Knox (former Northern State Conference)
 LaVille (former Northern State Conference)
 North Judson-San Pierre (Independent, former NWHC member)
 Pioneer (former Midwest Conference)
 Triton (former Northern State Conference)
 West Central (former Midwest Conference)
 Winamac (former Midwest Conference)
The Midwest Conference disbands after four schools leave for the HNAC:
 Frontier and Tri-County join the Hoosier Heartland Conference.
 South Newton joins the Sangamon Valley Conference in Illinois, becoming the only Indiana school to play in an out-of-state conference.
 North White does not currently have a conference to join.
The Northern State Conference disbands after four schools leave for the HNAC:
 Bremen, Jimtown, John Glenn, and New Prairie join the Northern Indiana Conference, growing that league to 13 schools.
The Mid-Indiana Conference disbands: 
 Cass, Hamilton Heights, Northwestern, and Western join the Hoosier Athletic Conference.
 Eastern (Greentown) and Taylor join the Hoosier Heartland Conference.
 Maconaquah and Peru join the Three Rivers Conference.
Other conference moves include:
 Carroll (FW) and Homestead, forced out of the Northeast Hoosier Conference, join the Summit Conference in football and basketball.
 The Pioneer Conference expands by four schools, adding former MEC member Muncie Burris, as well as independents Anderson Prep, Seton Catholic (Richmond), and University (Carmel).
 Leo and Huntington North join the Northeast Hoosier Conference. Leo left the Allen County Athletic Conference, and Huntington North left the North Central Conference.
 The North Central Conference adds Arsenal Tech from the IPS Conference to take Huntington North's place.
 The Western Indiana Conference, after courting Greencastle of the West Central Conference, agrees to take all five remaining WCC schools, effectively ending the league.
 Delphi, after refusing to play some of the larger schools in the Hoosier Athletic Conference in 2016-17, and asking to leave the conference that year, has their membership terminated on December 17, 2015. Even though they will play through their schedules, they will not be eligible for conference awards.

2021-2022 
 Carmel and Center Grove leave the MIC to join the Hoosier Crossroads Conference, but are not accepted and elect to go Independent.

External links
 Indiana High School Athletic Association Conference Rosters
 The Senior Reports 

 
High school
High school athletic